Koolmajärve is a village in Veriora Parish, Põlva County in southeastern Estonia.

Before the administrative reform of Estonian municipalities in 2017, the village belonged to Veriora municipality.

References

 

Villages in Põlva County